The Army of the Danube was a field army of the French First Republic. Originally named the Army of Observation, it was expanded with elements of the Army of Mainz (Mayence) and the Army of Helvetia (Switzerland). The army had three divisions plus an advance guard, a reserve, and an artillery park. The artillery park was under the command of Jean Ambroise Baston de Lariboisière and consisted of 33 cannons and 19 howitzers operated by 1,329 non-commissioned officers and cannoneers as well as 60 officers. There were approximately 25,000 members of the Army, the role of which was to invade southwestern Germany, precipitating the War of the Second Coalition.

The Army crossed the Rhine River on 1 March 1799 under the command of Jean-Baptiste Jourdan, in the order of battle below. As elements crossed the Rhine, they took the name "Army of the Danube". The crossing was completed by 7 March. After passing through the Black Forest, the Army fought two battles in quick succession, the Battle of Ostrach, on 20–21 March, and Stockach, on 25–26 March. It suffered badly in both engagements and, following the action at Stockach, withdrew to the Black Forest. Jourdan established his headquarters at Hornberg, and the Reserve cavalry and the cavalry of the Advance Guard quartered near Offenburg, where the horses could find better forage.

Initially, the Army included six future Marshals of France: its commander-in-chief, Jourdan; François Joseph Lefebvre; Jean-Baptiste Drouet; Laurent de Gouvion Saint-Cyr; Gabriel Jean Joseph Molitor; and Édouard Adolphe Casimir Joseph Mortier. After the defeat at Ostrach, the Army was reorganized and command shifted to another future marshal, André Masséna. Under Masséna's command, elements of the army participated in skirmishes in Switzerland, the eleven-hour Battle of Winterthur and the First and Second Battles of Zürich. The Army was disbanded in November 1799 and its units dispersed among other French field armies by mid-December.

Staff
Jean-Baptiste Jourdan received command of the Army of Observation in September 1798, from its temporary commander, Pierre Marie Barthélemy Ferino. From October to December, he assessed its condition. By 27 February 1799 Moreau had drawn together his general staff and laid out his operational plan for a Danube campaign.

General Staff

Advance Guard
The Advance Guard crossed the Rhine River at Kehl, and marched to the northeast. François Joseph Lefebvre was indisposed—suffering from ringworm—and Jourdan had appointed General of Division Dominique Vandamme to direct the march. Vandamme had been lobbying with Jourdan for a larger and more important command but, given the claims of other officers, this was the best Jourdan could do for him. Vandamme led the Advance Guard through the mountains via Freudenstadt. On 5 March, Lefebvre returned to his command. Within a week, part of the advance guard broke off from the main body and, under command of Vandamme, moved to Stuttgart, to investigate the rumored presence of Habsburg units.

I. Division
The Division crossed the Rhine River at Hüningen near Basel, Switzerland, and marched in two columns eastward. The right column, commanded by Jean Victor Tharreau, moved along the northern shoreline of the Rhine. The left column, commanded by Jean-Baptiste Jacopin, moved at the northernmost rim of the river valley. From Switzerland, Masséna sent a Demi-brigade of the Army of Helvetia to secure Schaffhausen, part of the Swiss cantons that lie north of the Rhine river. In holding Schaffhausen, Masséna insured the passage of Ferino's forward units. Ferino's orders were to proceed from Schaffhausen along the north shore of Lake Constance, also called the Bodensee. His left flank was to remain in contact with the II. Division, to prevent the Austrians from piercing the army's forward line. His advance units were to proceed as far as the Imperial Abbey of Salem. From there, he was instructed to prevent any Austrian reinforcements from Switzerland joining with Archduke Charles, whom Jourdan expected to move across the Iller river near Augsburg, and advance into Swabia.

II. Division
The Division followed the Advance Guard across the Rhine, also at Kehl. As it approached the mountains, II. Division followed the river valleys east of Freudenstadt.  At the Battle of Ostrach, II. Division took position behind François Joseph Lefebvre's Advance Guard, on the slope below Pfullendorf.  At the Battle of Stockach, Souham's Division, positioned in the center, was to coordinate a simultaneous assault with Ferino's I. Division on the Austrian left flank.

III. Division
The Third Division and the Reserve also crossed at Kehl, and then divided into two columns, III. Division traveling through the Black Forest via Oberkirch, and the Reserve, with most of the artillery park, via the valleys at Freiburg im Breisgau, where the horses would find more forage, and then over the mountains past the Titisee to Löffingen and Hüfingen.  At the Battle of Ostrach, after more than 15 hours of general engagement, the Austrians flanked the III. Division's left wing and pressed the entire Division back to the Pfullendorf heights. At the Battle of Stockach, Saint-Cyr and Vandamme were to execute simultaneous attacks on the Austrian right flank, Saint-Cyr on the front and Vandamme from the rear; the attacks failed when Archduke Charles moved support troops from the left flank.

Reserve
The Reserve crossed the river at Kehl, swung south toward Freiburg im Breisgau, and crossed the mountains at Neustadt, to Loffingen, Bruhlingen and Hüfingen. At the Battle of Ostrach, the Reserve remained in the northern outskirts of Pfullendorf and did not participate in the battle except in small groups. When Jourdan decided to withdraw, d'Hautpoul's cavalry moved to the west first, to secure bridges and the east–west roads. At the battle of Stockach, the Reserve was slow to support of Ferino's I. Division, which had run out of ammunition; when a cavalry charged failed to materialize, the Austrians acquired the upper hand. Jourdan later charged d'Hautpoul with dereliction. After the Stockach engagement, most of the Reserve withdrew to the west side of the Black Forest, where the horses could find forage, but by late April, the Reserve had joined with the André Masséna's Army of Helvetia outside of Zürich; d'Hautpoul joined them in July after he was cleared by a Courts-martial in Strasbourg.

Artillery park
Command: Jean Ambroise Baston de Lariboisière
 Cannons: 33 four-pounders; 21 eight-pounders; and seven 12-pounders
 Howitzers: 19
 Personnel (effective strength): 1,329 non-commissioned officers and cannoneers; 60 officers;  Total 1,389

Sources

Citations and notes

Bibliography
 Alison, Sir Archibald. A History of Europe from the Commencement of the French Revolution in 1789 to the Restoration of the Bourbons, New York: A.S. Barnes, 1850. .
 Blanning, Timothy. The French Revolutionary Wars. New York: Oxford University Press, 1996, .
 Broughton, Tony. Regimental Histories of the Carabiniers. (July 2000). French Foot Artillery., 1st Dragoons., 6th Dragoons, and  7th Horse Artillery. (August 2000). Commanders of the 10th Regiment of Chasseurs-a-Cheval (November 2000). Military Subjects: Organization, Tactics and Strategy. Napoleon Series. Robert Burnham, Editor in chief.  Accessed 8 May 2010.
 Broughton, Tony.  "Generals Who Served in the French Army during the Period 1789–1814: Vabre to Voulland". Napoleon Series.org. Robert Burnham, Editor in chief. November 2007. Accessed 24 April 2010.
 Dodge, Theodore Ayrault. Napoleon: A History of the Art of War. volume 3, Boston: Houghton Mifflin Co, 1904.
 Gallagher, John, Napoleon's enfant terrible: General Dominique Vandamme, Tulsa, University of Oklahoma Press, 2008, .
 Haythornthwaite, Philip J. Napoleon's commanders. London: Osprey Military, 2001–2002. .
 Hug, Lina and Richard Stead. Switzerland. The Nineteenth Century: General Collection; N.1.1.4543 (microfilmed). New York: G.P. Putnam's Sons, 1902. 
 Jourdan, Jean-Baptiste. A Memoir of the Operations of the Army of the Danube under the Command of General Jourdan, taken from the manuscripts of that officer. Translation of: Précis des opérations de l'armée du Danube, sous les ordres du Général Jourdan. William Combe (trans.). London: Debrett, 1799. .
 Kessinger, Roland and Gert Vanuythoven. Order of Battle, Army of the Danube. Stockach: Roland Kessinger & Geert van Uythoven. Accessed 14 April 2010.
  Kessinger, Roland.  '"Die Schlacht von Stockach am 25. März 1799". Zeitschrift für Militärgeschichte.  Salzburg: Öst. Milizverlag, 1997–.  [2006].
 Phipps, Ramsay Weston and Elizabeth Sandars (editor). Armies of the French Republic, Westport CT: Greenwood Press, 1939, volume 5. 
 Shadwell, Lawrence. Mountain Warfare Illustrated by the Campaign of 1799 in Switzerland (being a translation of the Swiss narrative, compiled from the works of the Archduke Charles, Jomini, and others...) London: Henry S. King, 1875. 
 Smith, Digby. Napoleonic Wars Databook: Actions and Losses in Personnel, Colours, Standards and Artillery, 1792–1815. Mechanicsburg PA: Stackpole, 1998, .
 Smith, Digby. Napoleon's Regiments: Battle Histories of the Regiments of the French Armies, 1792–1815. London: Greenhill, 2000. 
 Thiers, Adolphe. The History of the French Revolution. Frederick Shobert (trans.) New York: Appleton, 1854, v. 4. 

Danube
Danube
French Revolutionary Wars
French Revolutionary Wars orders of battle